Kayalpattinam (also known as Kayalpatnam or Kayalpattanam) is a Municipality in Thoothukudi district in the Indian state of Tamil Nadu. As of 2011, the town had a population of 40,588.

History 

Also known as Kayal, it is referred to in Marco Polo's travel diaries dating to 1298 AD. Korkai, vaguthai or Kayal was an ancient port dating to the 1st centuries of the common era and was contemporaneous to the existence of Kollam, another Pandyan port. Kollam served the Pandyas on the west coast while Korkai/Kayal served them on the east coast connecting them to Ceylon and the pearl fisheries in the Gulf of Mannar facing the Tirunelveli Coast. Arab traders from Egypt and Yemen landed at the port of Korkai (the present Kayalpatnam). some traders migrated to Adirampattinam. Strong trading connections existed with (Sri Lanka). There exist a strong cultural connection between Kayalpattinam, Adirampattinam and Kilakarai. Most of the Muslims here are matrilocal residents. The ancient port had trade connections with Egypt, Rome and Greece.

Ibn Battuta, the Muslim Moroccan explorer has mentioned about Kayalpattinam (as called as Fatan) in his travel node The Rihla (lit. "Journey"). There exist a strong cultural connection exists between Kayalpatnam, Adirampattinam and Kilakarai.

Kayalpatnam now has many Mosques (also known as Masjid). Noted photographer Benoy Behl has made a film on Islamic Architecture of India, and he visited this Kayalpatnam Mosque.

Demographics

According to 2011 census, Kayalpattinam had a population of 40,588 with a sex-ratio of 1,082 females for every 1,000 males, much above the national average of 929. A total of 4,995 were under the age of six, constituting 2,548 males and 2,447 females. Scheduled Castes and Scheduled Tribes accounted for 7.37% and .01% of the population respectively. The average literacy of the town was 81.3%, compared to the national average of 72.99%. The town had a total of : 9417 households. There were a total of 11,414 workers, comprising 17 cultivators, 27 main agricultural labourers, 206 in house hold industries, 10,717 other workers, 447 marginal workers, 9 marginal cultivators, 4 marginal agricultural labourers, 30 marginal workers in household industries and 404 other marginal workers.

As per the religious census of 2011, Kayalpattinam had 26.34% Hindus, 67.24% Muslims, 6.36% Christians, 0.01%  following other religions.

Culture
Most of Muslims here follow Shafiee Madhab with Qadiriyya and  Shadhiliya Tariqa (Sufi order) Qadiriyya tariqa connected to Mahlara and Shadhiliya tariqa connected to zaviya Faasiyatush shadhiliya Tariqa. Headquarters of this tariqa in India  Zaviathul Fasiyathus shathulia is located here. There are few followers of ahle hadees also. Maqbara of Kazi Syed Alauddin brother of Kazi Syed Tajuddin the fore father of Madurai Maqbara Hazrats' and of all the Syeds living in Kazimar Street, Madurai is located here.

Islamic Educational institutions
 Al Madrasatul Fasiyyah
 Al Mahlarathul Qadhiriyyah
 Al Madrasatul Hamidhiyya
 Madrasathul Azhar li Thahfeezil Quraanil Kareem
 Da'wathul Huda
 Aroosul Jannah Women's Islamic college
 Ayisha Siddiqua women's Islamic college
 Al Kulliyathun Nasuhiyya women's Islamic college
 Muaskarur Rahman Women's Islamic college
 Muaskarur Rahman Hifz college for Women's

References 

Cities and towns in Thoothukudi district